Colin Bibi (born June 4, 1995)  is a Seychellois football player. He is a midfielder playing for La Passe FC and the Seychelles national football team. He has represented Seychelles in the AFCON 2018.

International career

International goals
Scores and results list Seychelles' goal tally first.

References

External links 
 Colin Bibi at National-Football Teams

1995 births
Living people
Seychellois footballers
Seychelles international footballers
La Passe FC players
Association football midfielders